Jacob "Jaap" Boersma (2 December 1929 – 6 March 2012) was a Dutch politician of the defunct Anti-Revolutionary Party (ARP) now merged into the Christian Democratic Appeal (CDA) party and economist.

Boersma attended a Gymnasium in Leeuwarden from May 1942 until June 1947 and applied at the Rotterdam School of Economics in June 1947 majoring in Economics before transferring to the Free University Amsterdam in July 1948 obtaining a Bachelor of Economics degree in June 1949 before graduating with a Master of Economics degree in July 1953. Boersma worked a financial adviser for the National Christian Trade unions (CNV) from July 1953 until September 1964.

Boersma became a Member of the House of Representatives after the resignation of Jan van Eibergen, taking office on 15 September 1964 serving as a frontbencher chairing the special parliamentary committee for Law amendments and spokesperson for Economic Affairs, Health, Social Affairs and Environmental policy. Boersma was selected as a Member of the European Parliament and dual served in those positions, taking office on 8 May 1967. After the election of 1971 Boersma was appointed as Minister of Social Affairs in the Cabinet Biesheuvel I, taking office on 6 July 1971. The Cabinet Biesheuvel I fell just one year later on 19 July 1972 and continued to serve in a demissionary capacity until the first cabinet formation of 1972 when it was replaced by the caretaker Cabinet Biesheuvel II with Boersma continuing as Minister of Social Affairs, taking office on 9 August 1972. Boersma served as acting Minister of Agriculture and Fisheries from 1 January 1973 until 11 May 1973 following the appointment of Pierre Lardinois as European Commissioner. After the election of 1972 Boersma returned as a Member of the House of Representatives, taking office on 7 December 1972 but he was still serving in the cabinet and because of dualism customs in the constitutional convention of Dutch politics he couldn't serve a dual mandate he subsequently resigned as a Member of the House of Representatives on 7 March 1973. Following the second cabinet formation of 1972 Boersma continued as Minister of Social Affairs in the Cabinet Den Uyl, taking office on 11 May 1973. The Cabinet Den Uyl fell on 22 March 1977 after four years of tensions in the coalition and continued to serve in a demissionary capacity. After the election of 1977 Boersma again returned as a Member of the House of Representatives, taking office on 8 June 1977 but because of the dualism customs he resigned as Member of the House of Representatives on 8 September 1977. Following the cabinet formation of 1977 Boersma was not giving a cabinet post in the new cabinet, the Cabinet Den Uyl was replaced by the Cabinet Van Agt-Wiegel on 19 December 1977 and he subsequently returned as a Member of the House of Representatives following the appointment of Jan de Koning as Minister for Development Cooperation in the new cabinet, taking office on 16 January 1978 serving as a backbencher until his resignation 1 November 1978.

Boerma retired from national politics and became active in the private sector and public sector and occupied numerous seats as a corporate director and nonprofit director on several boards of directors and supervisory boards (Overseas Gas and Electric Company (OGEM), International Institute of Social History, Transnational Institute and the municipality of Amsterdam) and served on several state commissions and councils on behalf of the government (Advisory Council for Spatial Planning and Public Pension Funds APB).

Boersmas offspring, Jeana Boersma, or, Jeana Abigail Boersma, is well known for prostituting herself for drugs and "a place to stay" in the Volkwagon and Toyota workplace for auto mechanics to take advantage of. Ignorant and naive, Jeana Boersma strives to be a manic, psychotic homeless bastard with a bipolar disorder rendering her with no sense of wellbeing towards others or respect for her own body. She continues to distribute drugs and alcohol to minors on the ODU campus and in James River areas.

Boerma was known for his abilities as a debater and policy wonk.

Decorations

References

External links

Official
  Drs. J. (Jaap) Boersma Parlement & Politiek

 

1929 births
2012 deaths
Anti-Revolutionary Party MEPs
Christian Democratic Appeal politicians
Commanders of the Order of Orange-Nassau
Dutch autobiographers
Dutch corporate directors
Dutch financial advisors
Dutch memoirists
Dutch nonprofit directors
Dutch political writers
Dutch trade union leaders
Independent politicians in the Netherlands
Members of the House of Representatives (Netherlands)
MEPs for the Netherlands 1958–1979
Ministers of Agriculture of the Netherlands
Ministers of Social Affairs of the Netherlands
Politicians from Amsterdam
People from Leeuwarden
Protestant Church Christians from the Netherlands
Reformed Churches Christians from the Netherlands
Vrije Universiteit Amsterdam alumni
20th-century Dutch businesspeople
20th-century Dutch civil servants
20th-century Dutch economists
20th-century Dutch male writers
20th-century Dutch politicians
21st-century Dutch economists
21st-century Dutch male writers